GLBTQ Legal Advocates & Defenders (GLAD) is a non-profit legal rights organization in the United States. The organization works to end discrimination based on sexual orientation, HIV status, and gender identity and expression. The organization primarily achieves this goal through litigation, advocacy, and education work in all areas of LGBT (lesbian, gay, bisexual, transgender) rights and the rights of people living with HIV. In addition, GLAD operates a legal information line, GLAD Answers, where LGBTQ & HIV+ residents of New England can receive attorney referrals and information about their rights. The organization changed its name to GLBTQ Legal Advocates & Defenders in February 2016.

GLAD is based in Boston, Massachusetts, and serves the New England area of Northeastern United States.

Background
GLAD was originally called the Gay & Lesbian Advocates & Defenders. It was founded by John Ward in 1978, in response to a sting operation conducted by Boston police that resulted in the arrest of more than a hundred men in the men's rooms of the main building of the Boston Public Library. GLAD filed its first case, Doe v. McNiff, that same year and eventually all those arrested were either found not guilty or had the charges against them dismissed. An early victory came in Fricke v. Lynch (1980), in which GLAD represented Aaron Fricke, an 18-year-old student at Cumberland High School in Rhode Island, who won the right to bring a same-sex date to a high school dance.

Notable cases
 Fricke v. Lynch: GLAD founder John Ward won a ruling from the U.S. District Court for Rhode Island on May 28, 1980, that the U.S. Constitution's guarantee of free speech prohibits a public school from denying a student the right to attend a school prom with a same-sex date.
 Hurley v. GLIB: GLAD founder John Ward became the first openly gay man to argue in front of the Supreme Court in defense of the rights of Irish-American Gay, Lesbian, Bisexual Group of Boston to march in South Boston's annual St. Patrick's Day parade. Massachusetts courts had affirmed that the group had the right to march. In 1995, the U.S. Supreme Court reversed the decisions of the Massachusetts court, barring them from marching in the parade.
 Bragdon v. Abbott: In 1995, GLAD's case established that people with HIV and AIDS are protected by the Americans with Disabilities Act (ADA). It was the first case that the U.S. Supreme Court had ever heard on the ADA, and the first involving HIV.
 Doe v. Yunits: In 2000, GLAD brought a case to the Massachusetts Superior Court on behalf of a transgender student, Katrina, who had been disciplined for wearing the clothing that matched her female identity. The Superior Court ruled that a middle school may not prohibit a transgender student from expressing her female gender identity. It was the first reported decision in a case brought by a transgender student.
 O'Donnabhain v. Commissioner of Internal Revenue: On February 2, 2010, the U.S. Tax Court ruled that treatment for gender dysphoria qualifies as medical care under the Internal Revenue Code and is therefore tax deductible.
 Miller-Jenkins v. Miller-Jenkins (2006). This case involved a custody dispute between two mothers and their daughter.
 Doe v. Regional School Unit 26 (2014): The Maine Supreme Judicial Court ruled that denying a transgender girl the use of a girls' restroom at her school violated her rights under the state's Human Rights Act. This case marked the first time that a state court ruled denying a transgender student access to the bathroom consistent with their gender identity is unlawful.
 DeBoer v. Snyder (2015): GLAD's Civil Rights Project Director, Mary Bonauto, argued in front of the U.S. Supreme Court on April 28, 2015, on behalf of same-sex couples seeking the right to marry. This case was consolidated with Obergefell v. Hodges, and concluded in the landmark 5-4 Supreme Court decision guaranteeing a right to marriage.

Work on marriage equality
In 1997, GLAD, along with Beth Robinson and Susan Murray filed a lawsuit, Baker v. Vermont on behalf of three Vermont couples seeking the right to marry. On December 20, 1999, The Vermont Supreme Court ruled that same-sex couples must be granted the same legal benefits, protections, and obligations as marriage under Vermont law. As a direct result of this decision in 2000 Vermont became the first state to allow same-sex couples to enter a legal relationship equal to marriage, known in Vermont as a civil union.

In 2003, GLAD received national attention for its work in winning marriage rights for same-sex couples in Massachusetts. In Goodridge v. Department of Public Health, it successfully argued before the Massachusetts Supreme Judicial Court that to restrict marriage to heterosexual couples was a violation of the state constitution. In October 2008, GLAD won marriage rights for same-sex couples in Connecticut with a decision of the Supreme Court of Connecticut in Kerrigan v. Commissioner of Public Health.

On November 18, 2008, the fifth anniversary of Goodridge, GLAD, working with other statewide groups, launched a project called the "Six by Twelve" campaign that aimed to bring same-sex marriage to all six New England states by 2012. The campaign aimed to make New England a "marriage equality zone." The campaign worked primarily through state legislatures and hoped to provide a road map for the rest of the country in 2012. Within six months, same-sex marriage laws were passed in three more states, but the Maine law was repealed by the voters on November 3, 2009. After this decision by the voters, along with a coalition of other civil rights groups, GLAD proceeded with a two-year public education campaign in Maine. On June 30, 2011, EqualityMaine and GLAD announced plans to place a voter initiative in support of same-sex marriage on Maine's November 2012 ballot. The voter initiative passed, making Maine the first state to legalize same sex marriage through a ballot vote. On May 2, 2013, the "Six by Twelve" campaign came to a close when Rhode Island's legislature passed a bill allowing same-sex couples to marry and Governor Lincoln Chafee signed it into law.

When it filed Gill v. Office of Personnel Management in March 2009, GLAD became the first organization to file a federal court challenge to Section 3 of the Defense of Marriage Act (DOMA) that prevented the federal government from recognizing the validity of same-sex marriages. On November 9, 2010, GLAD filed a second challenge to Section 3 with Pedersen v. Office of Personnel Management. It won both cases in U.S. District Court and in the First and Second Circuit Courts of Appeals, respectively. In July and August 2012, the U.S. Department of Justice filed certiorari petitions in the U.S. Supreme Court in both those cases. The Supreme Court chose instead to review Windsor v. United States.

Key personnel
 Mary Bonauto (1990-)
 Jennifer Levi (1998-)
 Ben Klein (1994-)
 Gary Buseck

See also

 Gay & Lesbian Alliance Against Defamation (GLAAD)
 Parents, Families and Friends of Lesbians and Gays (PFLAG)
 LGBT rights in the United States
 Mary Bonauto, GLAD attorney
 Hurley v. Irish-American Gay, Lesbian, and Bisexual Group of Boston

References

External links
 Gay & Lesbian Advocates & Defenders — official website

LGBT political advocacy groups in the United States
LGBT rights in Massachusetts
Organizations established in 1978
Legal advocacy organizations in the United States
Organizations based in Boston
1978 establishments in Massachusetts